Darram Rural District is in the Central District of Tarom County, Zanjan province, Iran. At the National Census of 2006, its population was 4,583 in 1,217 households. There were 4,703 inhabitants in 1,416 households at the following census of 2011. At the most recent census of 2016, the population of the rural district was 4,406 in 1,423 households. The largest of its 41 villages was Darram, with 1,701 people.

References 

Tarom County

Rural Districts of Zanjan Province

Populated places in Zanjan Province

Populated places in Tarom County